Raylin Joy Christensen  (born February 18, 1987), formerly known by her stage name Skin Diamond, is an American actress, model, singer-songwriter and former pornographic actress.

A very active performer in the adult industry since her late teens, Christensen has recently retired from adult film acting to pursue other interests such as songwriting and mainstream acting.

Early life
Christensen was born on February 18, 1987, in Ventura, California, She was raised in Dunfermline, Scotland where her parents took up position as missionaries. Her father is Rodd Christensen, an actor and photographer of Eritrean descent and her mother is of Czech, Danish, German and Yugoslavian descent.

Career

Christensen started her career as an alternative model posing for GodsGirls, before branching out into art modeling and fetish modeling for photographers in Europe and the United States. Her unique look attracted the attention of a wide variety of photographers.

In 2009, she posed on the cover of Bizarre winning their first ever "Cover Girl Search" competition, after which she was signed to London-based modeling agency Girl Management. She also entered the adult film industry in 2009, performing her first scenes with Joanna Angel and James Deen for Burning Angel.

In 2011, she posed in an editorial campaign for i-D magazine's "The Exhibitionist Issue No. 312" wearing Louis Vuitton and American Apparel.

In 2012, Christensen posed for comic book artist David Mack, who portrayed her as Echo in the Marvel Comics miniseries Daredevil: End of Days.

Christensen first dabbled in the music industry with her 2013 song/music video, "Sex in a Slaughter House". which she wrote as part of a scene for Brazzers.

In 2014, Christensen was on CNBC's list of "The Dirty Dozen: Porn's Most Popular Stars". Diamond also starred (with Allie Haze) in the music video for American hip hop recording artist B.o.B, for his song "John Doe", which features Priscilla Renea.

Christensen was the Penthouse Pet of the Month for July 2014. That same year, she made her directorial debut with the film Skin Diamond's Dollhouse for Deviant Entertainment.

In 2015, Christensen was named Penthouse Pet of the Year Runner-up.

In 2016, Christensen performed her last adult film scenes to pursue mainstream acting and singing full-time, after she was cast in the role of Dylan Quinn in Submission, a series on Showtime exploring BDSM themes. It was also during this time period that she launched her music project with the release of her first official single and music video ("Fire" produced by Ben Cole) under her real name, "Raylin Joy". She briefly posed for Dechristo Studios in 2019 in a shoot for Penthouse magazine

In April 2020, Christensen and eleven other adult/former adult actresses appeared in the music video for the G-Eazy song "Still Be Friends".

Personal life
Diamond has two piercings in her navel, and one in her right nostril. She is also well known for her distinctive shaved-on-one-side haircut; because of this, she has been featured in the column "Beauty Showdown" in the magazine Cosmopolitan. When she first entered the adult film industry, her hair was pink. She is bisexual.

Filmography

Television

Awards and nominations

Discography 
 2016: "Fire" (single)
 2016: "All Night" (single)
 2016: "Feel Me" (single)
 2016: "Karma" (single)
 2016: "Sunny Grey" (single)
 2017: "Wet Dreams" (single)
 2017: "Freak" (single)

References

External links

 
 https://www.raylinjoy.com
 
 
 

1987 births
Living people
21st-century American singers
African-American pornographic film actors
Alt porn
American female adult models
American people of African descent
American people of Danish descent
American people of Czech descent
American people of Ethiopian descent
American people of German descent
American people of Yugoslav descent
American pornographic film actresses
American pornographic film directors
Bisexual musicians
Bisexual pornographic film actresses
Film directors from California
LGBT adult models
LGBT African Americans
American LGBT actors
LGBT people from California
Penthouse Pets
People from Ventura, California
Pornographic film actors from California
Songwriters from California
Women pornographic film directors
20th-century American LGBT people
21st-century LGBT people
21st-century African-American musicians
21st-century African-American women
20th-century African-American people
20th-century African-American women